Donzella J. James (born May 3, 1948) is an American politician. She is a member of the Georgia State Senate from the 35th District, serving since 2009. Senator James serves as the Chairwoman of Interstate Competition and is also a member of the Education and Youth, Special Judiciary, and Economic Development committees. 
She earned a Bachelor's degree in criminal justice and political science from Morris Brown College and has received honorary doctorates from Emmanuel Bible College and Bible Of Christ Bible College and Seminary in Nigeria. She is a member of the Democratic party.

References

External links
 Profile at the Georgia State Senate

Living people
Democratic Party Georgia (U.S. state) state senators
1948 births
Place of birth missing (living people)
21st-century American politicians
21st-century American women politicians
Women state legislators in Georgia (U.S. state)